Professor Julie Fitzpatrick OBE is a Scottish scientist and academic. She is the CEO of Moredun Research Institute and Scotland's part-time Chief Scientific Advisor. She attended Scientific Advisory Group for Emergencies meetings in that role.

Life
Fitzpatrick studied to become a vet at the University of Glasgow and she gained her doctorate at the University of Bristol. Her masters degree in Epidemiology came by remote learning from the London School of Hygiene and Tropical Medicine.

She was a member of Edinburgh Infectious Diseases. She is a Professor and Chair in Food Security at the University of Glasgow’s College of Medicine, Veterinary Medicine and Life Sciences.

In 2021 she became Scotland's part-time Chief Scientific Advisor and she will become part of the Scottish Science Advisory Council who advise the Scottish Government. She took over from physicist Sheila Rowan in June 2021. FitzPatrick will continue to also work as Chief Executive for the Moredun Research Institute who study animal welfare.

As the Scottish Government's advisor she attended Scientific Advisory Group for Emergencies (SAGE) meetings during the COVID-19 pandemic in Scotland to advise on possible future scenarios. In September it was considered uncertain as more people went back to work and schools were returning and other changes were being made. In January 2022 hospital admissions including ICU rates were reducing.

Awards and honours 
She was elected a Fellow of the Royal Society of Edinburgh in 2007 and a Fellow of the Royal Agricultural Society of Scotland in 2008.

Fitzpatrick was awarded an OBE for "services to livestock research" in 2014.

References

Living people
Year of birth missing (living people)
Alumni of the London School of Hygiene & Tropical Medicine
Alumni of the University of Glasgow
Alumni of the University of Bristol
Scottish women academics